Alimentary toxic aleukia is a mycotoxin-induced condition characterized by nausea, vomiting, diarrhea, leukopenia (aleukia), hemorrhaging, skin inflammation, and sometimes death. Alimentary toxic aleukia almost always refers to the human condition associated with presence of T-2 toxin.

History 
Alimentary toxic aleukia was first characterized in the early 20th century after affecting a large population in the Orenburg Oblast of the former USSR during World War II. The sick people had eaten overwintered grain colonized with Fusarium sporotrichioides and Fusarium poae.

References

Blood disorders